Radio Nauru, established on 1968, government-owned, non-commercial sole radio station in the Republic of Nauru. Owned by Nauru Broadcasting Service. It broadcasts in 105.1 MHz FM and operates from Mondays to Sundays 6:00 AM to 11:00 PM. Radio Nauru offers program of traditional culture, news, information and classical and modern music, as well as island music. It carries programs of Radio Australia and BBC.

Nauruan radio networks
1968 establishments in Nauru
Radio stations established in 1968